Olli Juolevi (born 5 May 1998) is a Finnish professional ice hockey defenceman currently playing for the San Diego Gulls in the American Hockey League (AHL) while under contract to the Anaheim Ducks of the National Hockey League (NHL). He was selected fifth overall by the Vancouver Canucks in the 2016 NHL Entry Draft. Born and raised in Finland, Juolevi developed in the Jokerit program before he moved to North America to play major junior hockey with the Ontario Hockey League (OHL)'s London Knights in 2015. After one season with London, he was drafted by the Canucks.

Internationally, Juolevi has represented Finland in three World Junior Championships, winning gold at the 2016 tournament.

Playing career
At age 14, Juolevi began playing junior hockey in Finland for Jokerit's U16 team in 2012–13. By the following year, he was playing for Jokerit's U20 team in the Jr. A SM-liiga. After scoring 32 points (6 goals and 26 assists) in 44 games, he was named to the league's First All-Star Team and awarded Rookie of the Year. During the off-season, Juolevi was selected 45th overall by the London Knights of the Ontario Hockey League (OHL) at the 2015 Canadian Hockey League Import Draft. Juolevi committed to the Knights shortly thereafter, leaving his junior career in Finland.

With 42 points (9 goals and 33 assists) in 57 games, Juolevi ranked third among OHL rookie defencemen and 13th among defencemen overall in 2015–16. He was named to the OHL Third All-Star Team and Second All-Rookie Team. During the 2016 OHL playoffs, he added 14 points (3 goals and 11 assists) in 18 games, ranking second among all defencemen, as the Knights won the J. Ross Robertson Cup as OHL champions. With the Knights advancing to the 2016 Memorial Cup, Juolevi recorded seven assists in four games and was named to the tournament's All-Star Team, helping London to a national championship.

Having played a key role in London's championship season, Juolevi was highly regarded by scouts. NHL Central Scouting ranked him fifth among draft-eligible players competing in North America, praising his offensive play. During the 2016 NHL Entry Draft, he was the first defenceman selected, fifth overall by the Vancouver Canucks. On 5 August 2016, Juolevi signed his first professional contract in agreeing to a three-year, entry-level contract with the Canucks.

Juolevi was assigned to Vancouver's AHL affiliate, the Utica Comets, to start the 2018–19 season.  After registering 13 points in 18 games in his first AHL season, Juolevi was sidelined for the remainder of the year due to knee surgery.

Following his injury-shortened season, Juolevi was again sent to Utica to start for the 2019–20 season. After 5 points in 14 games, Juolevi again suffered an injury in November 2019, though he returned three weeks later. Juolevi would play in 45 games with Utica, scoring 25 points, before the 2019–20 AHL season was suspended and later cancelled due to the COVID-19 pandemic.

Juolevi made his NHL debut with the Canucks during the 2020 Stanley Cup playoffs, playing in the fourth and final game of Vancouver's Qualifying Round series against the Minnesota Wild. He played 6:16 in the game, which Vancouver won 5–4 in overtime to eliminate Minnesota and move onto the First Round.

The following season, Juolevi earned a spot on Vancouver's roster out of training camp for the first time in his career. He scored his first career goal on 25 January 2021 in a 7–1 win over the Ottawa Senators.

On 10 October 2021, Juolevi was traded to the Florida Panthers in exchange for Noah Juulsen and Juho Lammikko. He began the  season on the Panthers roster, adding depth to the blueline in remaining as a healthy scratch. Yet to feature with the Panthers, he was assigned on a conditioning stint to AHL affiliate, the Charlotte Checkers, before returning to the Panthers and making his debut against the Arizona Coyotes on 10 December 2021. He went scoreless over 10 games before on 5 March 2022, Juolevi was placed on waivers by the Panthers. The following day, Juolevi tenure with the Panthers ended after he was claimed by the Detroit Red Wings.

On July 27, 2022,  Juolevi signed a one-year, two-way contract with the Anaheim Ducks.

International play

Juolevi played for Finland at the 2016 World Junior Championships, where they won gold on 5 January 2016. In recognition of his play, he was named to the tournament All-star team.

Juolevi was named Finland's captain for the 2017 World Junior Championships. In the tournament, Finland was unable to match their success from the previous year, placing ninth and defeating Team Latvia to avoid relegation.

Career statistics

Regular season and playoffs

International

Awards and honors

References

External links
 

1998 births
Living people
Charlotte Checkers (2010–) players
Detroit Red Wings players
London Knights players
Ice hockey people from Helsinki
Finnish ice hockey defencemen
Florida Panthers players
National Hockey League first-round draft picks
San Diego Gulls (AHL) players
HC TPS players
Utica Comets players
Vancouver Canucks draft picks
Vancouver Canucks players